Deadlock is a situation in computing where two processes are each waiting for the other to finish.

Deadlock or deadlocked may also refer to:

Film
Deadlock (1931 film), a British crime film featuring Stewart Rome, Marjorie Hume and Warwick Ward
Deadlock (1943 film), a British crime film starring John Slater
Man-Trap or Deadlock, a 1961 American crime film featuring Jeffrey Hunter and David Janssen
Deadlock (1970 film), a West German Western starring Mario Adorf
Wedlock (film) or Deadlock, a 1991 American science fiction film featuring Rutger Hauer, Mimi Rogers and Joan Chen
Deadlock (2021 film), an American action thriller starring Bruce Willis

Television
 The Bold Ones: The Protectors or Deadlock, a 1969–1970 American crime drama television series
 "Deadlock" (Star Trek: Voyager), an episode of Star Trek: Voyager
 "Deadlock" (Battlestar Galactica), an episode of Battlestar Galactica
 A "Deadlock seal" is a type of nearly impregnable security in Doctor Who.

Music
 Deadlock (band), a German melodic death metal band
 "Deadlock", a 1970 song by Can from track from Soundtracks
 "Deadlock", a 1998 song by Front Line Assembly from Cryogenic Studios Compilation
 "Deadlocked", a 2012 song by F-777, available on Newgrounds

Computer games
 Deadlock: Planetary Conquest, a computer game by Accolade
 Ratchet: Deadlocked, a game in the Ratchet & Clank video game franchise
 Battlestar Galactica Deadlock, a 2017 turn-based strategy game

Print
 Deadlock (novel), a detective novel by Sara Paretsky starring private investigator V. I. Warshawski
 Deadlocked (novel), a Sookie Stackhouse novel by Charlaine Harris
 Deadlock, a character in ABC Warriors

Politics and law
 Deadlocked jury or hung jury
 Political deadlock or gridlock

Other uses
 Dead lock or deadbolt, a physical door locking mechanism
 Deadlock (game theory), a type of game in game theory, where the action that is mutually most beneficial is also dominant

See also

 Impasse